"Hear Me Say" is a song by English DJ and record producer Jonas Blue and Swedish singer Léon. It was released on 28 May 2021 via Positiva Records. The song was written by Daniel James, David Brook, Léon, Leah Haywood, Miya Miya, Rob Ellmore and Blue, who also produced the song.

Content
In a press release, Blue explained: ""Hear Me Say" is about a relationship that seemed perfect but the couple drifted apart somewhere along the way. They will always love each other, and will cherish the memories they created, but it was just not meant to be. It’s about having a voice, and people hearing your voice. It’s about expressing your feelings and not holding back what you want to say."

Composition
The song is written in the key of F major, with a tempo of 122 beats per minute.

Critical reception
The website Popjuice commented that the song "is sure to be played at parties everywhere as lockdowns slowly begin to lift around the world." Rachel Hammermueller of Earmilk described the track's "voice and quality feels right at home." And becomes "a choice tune to welcome the summer."

Music video
The music video was released on 2 July 2021, and directed by Alex Nicholson. The video was filmed in Mexico. It makes "a perfect summer day", including scenes of "lounging on a boat, running through the sand on a beach, exploring the tropics of a lagoon or hanging out in a beach house."

Track listing

Credits and personnel
Credits adapted from AllMusic.

 Jonas Blue – mixing, musical producer, primary artist, producer, recording arranger, composer
 David Brook – composer
 Dreamlab – vocal producer
 Rob Ellmore – composer
 Leah Haywood – composer
 Léon – composer, primary artist, vocals
 Mike Marsh – mastering engineer
 Miya Miya – composer, vocals
 Guy Phethean – keyboards

Charts

Weekly charts

Year-end charts

References

2021 songs
2021 singles
Jonas Blue songs
Songs written by Jonas Blue
Songs written by David Brook (songwriter)
Songs written by Leah Haywood
Positiva Records singles